Thomas P. McGarry (1937 – 2 December 2021) was an Irish hurler, footballer and rugby union player. An all-round sportsman he played with a number of teams in all codes, including the Limerick senior hurling team, Cork Celtic and Young Munster.

Career

McGarry first came to sporting prominence as a hurler. A member of the Treaty Sarsfields club, he also represented CBS Sexton Street in the Harty Cup while also enjoying a two-year spell with the Limerick minor hurling team. McGarry made his senior debut in 1956, however, his seven-year career coincided with a barren spell for Limerick. In spite of this he earned selection on the Munster team and won five Railway Cup medals in a six-year period. McGarry also played rugby and association football at a high level. Playing in the centre, he captained Young Munster when they played Garryowen in the 1970-71 Munster Senior Cup final. McGarry also played League of Ireland soccer with Limerick F.C. and Cork Celtic.

Death

McGarry died on 2 December 2021.

Honours

Treaty Sarsfields
Limerick Senior Football Championship: 1956, 1957, 1963

Munster
Railway Cup: 1958, 1959, 1960, 1961, 1963

References

1937 births
2021 deaths
Limerick inter-county hurlers
Munster inter-provincial hurlers
Limerick F.C. players
Cork Celtic F.C. players
Young Munster players
Republic of Ireland association footballers
Association footballers not categorized by position